Darton is a large village in the Metropolitan Borough of Barnsley (part of South Yorkshire), on the border with West Yorkshire, England. At the time of the 2001 UK census, it had a population of 14,927, increasing to 21,345 for both Darton Wards (East & West) at the 2011 Census.

Parliamentary representation
Formerly part of the now defunct Barnsley West and Penistone borough constituency, following the Boundary Commission for England's report on South Yorkshire's Parliamentary constituencies in 2004 and an inquiry in 2005, it is now part of the Barnsley Central borough constituency.

Geography
It is served by the A637 road and is bisected by the M1 motorway (junction 38 being a mile to the north).

History
The name Darton is believed to be an amalgamation of "Dearne" and the Anglo-Saxon word "ton" (meaning 'town'). Hence, in ancient times it was known as the town on the Dearne. However, other sources dispute this explanation and claim that the name originates from a description given to a deer enclosure or something similar. In 1086 the hamlet of Dertone was in the wapentake of Staincross.

The hamlet grew to become a village so the Parish of Darton was founded in 1150, when the first church was built. As elsewhere in England, an official register of baptisms, deaths and marriages did not begin until later, in 1539. The parish was historically within the West Riding of Yorkshire and became a part of the former county of South Yorkshire upon its creation in 1974.

Present day
Darton has its own railway station on Northern's Hallam Line which links train journeys between Sheffield and Leeds. The railway station is in South Yorkshire but West Yorkshire Metro tickets are also valid to and from this station. The reason for this is because the West-South Yorkshire boundary ran between the village and its main source of employment, Woolley Colliery.

On 15 June 2007, Darton hit the national headlines after 48 hours of torrential rain caused the River Dearne to burst its banks leading to heavy flooding in the village. The main road through the village was rendered impassable and many homes and businesses were damaged, including the village post office, which re-opened in June 2008. Further flooding occurred in January 2008, although the damage and disruption caused this time was not as bad as the previous year's.

Education 
Darton has its own primary school and a secondary school called Darton Academy actually in Kexborough which opened in 2011. The new building (and rebranded school) replaced Darton High School -previously Darton Hall Senior School - that had been on the site since 1957.

Sport
Darton cricket club plays in the Pontefract and District Cricket League.
North Gawber Colliery F.C. are based in the village and play in the Sheffield and Hallamshire County Senior League Premier Division.

Notable people
David Booth, manager of Laos national football team, was raised in Darton.
Thomas Brackin, English first-class cricketer, lived here until his death in 1924.
Ian Butler, English professional footballer was born here.
Michael Clapham, Labour Party politician, was born in Darton.
Jack Grainger, English professional footballer, was born here.
Ken Knighton, professional footballer and former manager of Sunderland and Orient.
Alan Ogley, professional goalkeeper was born here.
Alban Turner, English first-class cricketer, was born here
Anna Cotton, nonconformist ironmaster family head, was buried here in 1721`
Margaret Souyave OBE, England and GB Women’s Hockey Captain and World Cup Winner 1975, UK Player of the Year 1990 and more recently team manager was raised in Darton.
Pearl Fawcett, world renowned accordion player was born in Darton. http://www.accordions.com/news.aspx?d=20-Apr-2012&lang=en&s=5509
John Braine reputedly wrote his first novel Room at the Top while working as a librarian in Darton Library in the early 1950s.

See also
Listed buildings in Darton

References

External links

 Darton village 
 Darton Primary School
 Darton College
 Darton Cricket Club

Villages in South Yorkshire
Unparished areas in South Yorkshire
Geography of the Metropolitan Borough of Barnsley